Qusha Bolagh-e Olya (also Romanized as Qūshā Bolāgh-e ‘Olyā; also known as Qūshā Bolāgh-e Bālā) is a village in Baba Jik Rural District, in the Central District of Chaldoran County, West Azerbaijan Province, Iran. At the 2006 census, its population was 351, in 62 families.

References 

Populated places in Chaldoran County